Sir Magdi Habib Yacoub  (born 16 November 1935), is an Egyptian retired professor of cardiothoracic surgery at Imperial College London, best known for his early work in repairing heart valves with surgeon Donald Ross, adapting the Ross procedure, where the diseased aortic valve is replaced with the person's own pulmonary valve, devising the arterial switch operation (ASO) in transposition of the great arteries, and establishing the heart transplantation centre at Harefield Hospital in 1980 with a heart transplant for Derrick Morris, who at the time of his death was Europe's longest-surviving heart transplant recipient. Yacoub subsequently performed the UK's first combined heart and lung transplant in 1983.

From 1986 to 2006, he held the position of British Heart Foundation Professor of Cardiothoracic Surgery at the National Heart and Lung Institute, Imperial College Faculty of Medicine. He is the founding editor of the journal Disease Models & Mechanisms.

His honours and awards include the Bradshaw Lecture from the Royal College of Physicians in 1988, a knighthood in the 1992 New Year Honours, the Texas Heart Institute's Ray C. Fish Award for Scientific Achievement in Cardiovascular Disease in 1998, the International Society for Heart and Lung Transplantation Lifetime Achievement Award in 2004, the European Society of Cardiology's gold medal in 2006, the Order of Merit in 2014, the Lister Medal from the Royal College of Surgeons in 2015 and the Khalaf Ahmad Al Habtoor Achievement Award (KAHAA) in 2019.

Following retirement from the National Health Service (NHS), he continued to operate on children through his charity, Chain of Hope. In 2008, he co-founded the Magdi Yacoub heart foundation, which launched the Aswan Heart project.

Early life and education
Magdi Habib Yacoub was born on the 16th of November in 1935 in Bilbeis, El Sharqia, Egypt to Coptic Christian family, and spent his childhood moving around a number of different small towns. His father was a surgeon, who later worked in public health. He died in 1958. Yacoub later recalled that both his father and the death of his youngest aunt at age 22 years from an uncorrected mitral stenosis during childbirth inspired him to study medicine and cardiology, saying that “this young woman would not have died if we had had access to facilities which were then available in a few centres around the world”.

At the age of 15, he entered the University of Cairo College of Medicine with a scholarship.

Early surgical career 

In 1957, Yacoub graduated in medicine from Cairo University and completed two years of residencies in surgery. In 1961 or 1962 he moved to Britain to study for his fellowship while working under Sir Russell Brock, consultant surgeon at Guy's Hospital.

Heart valve surgery

In 1964, he was appointed rotating surgical senior registrar to the National Heart and Chest Hospitals, where he worked with cardiothoracic surgeon Donald Ross. Here, they worked on repairing heart valves in people with severe valvular heart disease and heart failure. Four of their cases, operated on between December 1965 and October 1967, were reported on in the British Medical Journal (1968) in an article titled "Too ill for cardiac surgery?". Three had severe aortic valve disease and one had rheumatic heart disease with multiple affected valves. All four had a poor prognosis with death expected within a few days and all four survived surgery. He carried out a number of Ross procedures, where the diseased aortic valve is replaced with the person's own pulmonary valve, particularly in growing children. It became a popular alternative to the surgical treatment of aortic valve disease in young adults and avoided the need for anticoagulation and repeated operations. Yacoub modified the operation by planning remodelling of the autograft root, the Ross-Yacoub procedure, performed in carefully selected people. At a time when cardiologists may have been reluctant to refer for surgery, Yacoub's search for operable people earned him the name "Magdi's midnight stars".

Later, his application for a job at the Royal Brompton Hospital was turned down.  In 1968, he moved to the United States and the following year he became Instructor and then Assistant Professor at the University of Chicago.

Harefield Hospital
In 1973, he became a consultant cardiothoracic surgeon at Harefield Hospital, West London, opened in 1921 as a TB sanatorium of single storey pavilions typical for such a hospital.  He later recalled that "I was tempted to stay in Chicago, as I was interested in the research they were doing there, but I had already accepted the position at Harefield before going to the US, so I was honour bound to return". At Harefield, he worked closely with Rosemary Radley-Smith, consultant in paediatric cardiology. 

As a visiting professor to the University of Nigeria, Nsukka, Yacoub, Fabian Udekwu, C. H Anyanwu, and others formed part of the team that performed the first open heart surgery in Nigeria in 1974.

Arterial Switch

In 1977, he devised a two-stage approach for an arterial switch operation (ASO) in older people with transposition of the great arteries with an intact ventricular septum (IVS).

Harefield Hospital transplant unit 
Yacoub began the transplant programme at Harefield Hospital in 1980 with a heart transplant for Derrick Morris, who became Europe's longest surviving heart transplant recipient until his death in July 2005. Two years later, he performed a heart transplant on John McCafferty, who survived for more than 33 years, until 10 February 2016 and became recognised as the world's longest surviving heart transplant patient by the Guinness World Records in 2013, surpassing the previous Guinness World Record of 30 years, 11 months and 10 days set by an American man who died in 2009.

In December 1983 Yacoub performed the UK's first combined heart and lung transplant at Harefield.

From 1986 to 2006, he held the position of  British Heart Foundation Professor of Cardiothoracic Surgery at the National Heart and Lung Institute, Imperial College Faculty of Medicine. In 1988, he became a member of the Royal Colleges of Physicians, twenty years after qualifying in surgery.

He is the founding editor of the journal Disease Models & Mechanisms.

He treated a number of politicians and celebrities throughout his surgical career, including comedian Eric Morecambe in 1979, Greek Prime Minister Andreas Papandreou in 1988, and actor Omar Sharif in 1993.

Later career 
He retired from the National Health Service in 2001 at the age of 65.

In 2006 he led a complex operation which required removing a transplant heart from a person whose own heart had recovered. The original heart had not been removed during transplant surgery nearly a decade earlier, in the hope it might recover.

In April 2007, it was reported that a British medical research team led by Yacoub had grown part of a human heart valve from stem cells.

Charities
In 1995, Yacoub founded the charity Of Ahmed Sherif "Chain of Hope", through which he continued to operate on children, and through which the provision of heart surgery for correctable heart defects are made possible in areas without specialist cardiac surgery units.

He is also the head of the Magdi Yacoub Global Heart Foundation, co-founded with Ahmed Zewail and Ambassador Mohamed Shaker in 2008, which launched the Aswan Heart project and founded the Aswan Heart Centre the following year.

Honours and awards

1988: Bradshaw Lecture, Royal College of Physicians. It was held in Sheffield.
1998: Texas Heart Institute Ray C. Fish Award for Scientific Achievement in Cardiovascular Disease.
1998: Elected Fellow of the Royal Society.
1999: Lifetime outstanding achievement award in recognition of contribution to medicine, Secretary of State for Health (UK).
2003: Golden Hippocrates International Award for Excellence in Cardiac Surgery (Moscow).
WHO Prize for Humanitarian Services.
2004: International Society for Heart and Lung Transplantation Lifetime Achievement Award, at the 24th annual meeting in San Francisco.
2006: European Society of Cardiology Gold Medal.
2007: Pride of Britain Award.
2007: Honorary citizenships of the city of Bergamo, Italy
2007: Medal of Merit, President, International Academy of Cardiovascular Sciences.
2011: Order of the Nile for science and humanity.
2012: American College of Cardiology Legend of Cardiovascular Medicine.
2015: Lister Medal for contributions to surgical science, presented by Clare Marx, President of the Royal College of Surgeons.
2019: Khalaf Ahmad Al Habtoor Achievement Award (KAHAA).
Yacoub was knighted in the 1992 New Year Honours and awarded the Order of Merit in the 2014 New Year Honours.

Personal and family
He is married to Marianne and they have three children and a number of grandchildren.

Yacoub enjoys swimming, listening to classical music and growing orchids.

Selected publications

Books
Annual of Cardiac Surgery. Current Science (1994). . J. Pepper (Ed)
Cardiac Valve Allografts : Science and Practice. Steinkopff-Verlag Heidelberg (1997). . With A. C. Yankah and R. Hetzer

Articles
"Vagotomy through mediastinoscopy for pulmonary osteoarthropathy. British Journal of Diseases of the Chest. Vol. 60, Issue 3 (July 1966), p. 144-147. , .
"Homograft replacement of the aortic valve. A critical review". Progress in Cardiovascular Diseases. Vol. 11, Issue 4 (January 1969), pp. 275–293. , . With Donald Ross
"Two-stage operation for anatomical correction of transposition of the great arteries with intact interventricular septum". The Lancet.  Vol. 1, Issue 8025 (June 1977), pp. 1275–8. , . Co-authored with R. Radley-Smith and R. Maclaurin.
"Fourteen-year experience with homovital homografts for aortic valve replacement". The Journal of Thoracic and Cardiovascular Surgery. Vol. 110, Issue 1 (July 1995), pp. 186–194. Yacoub et al
"Two Hearts that Beat as One". Circulation. Vol. 92, Issue 2 (15 July 1995), pp. 156–157. .
"An evaluation of the Ross operation in adults". Journal of Heart Valve Disease. Vol. 15, No. 4 (July 2006), pp. 531–9. . Yacoub et al.
"Is there a risk in avoiding risk for younger patients with aortic valve disease?". British Medical Journal. Vol. 342, 26 May 2011. . Co-authored with Tom Treasure and Asif Hasan
"The Ross operation in infants and children, when and how?". Heart. Vol. 100, Issue 24 (16 October 2014), pp. 1905–1906. . Co-authored with Ismail El-Hamamsy

References

External links
Profile from the Coptic Medical Society UK
Chain of Hope website
Magdi Yacoub Heart Foundation. Founded 2008

1935 births
Living people
Knights Bachelor
Members of the Order of Merit
Egyptian transplant surgeons
Fellows of the Royal Society
Members of the French Academy of Sciences
Egyptian emigrants to the United Kingdom
Coptic Christians
Egyptian Christians
People from Sharqia Governorate
Naturalised citizens of the United Kingdom
British transplant surgeons
20th-century British medical doctors
21st-century British medical doctors
British cardiologists
Egyptian cardiologists
20th-century surgeons
United Arab Emirates Health Foundation Prize laureates